Gurmukhī also known as Indian Punjabi is an abugida developed from the Laṇḍā scripts, standardized and used by the second Sikh guru, Guru Angad (1504–1552). It is used by Punjabi Sikhs to write the language, commonly regarded as a Sikh script, Gurmukhi is used in Punjab, India as the official script of the Punjabi language. While Shahmukhi script is used in Punjab, Pakistan as the official script. It is one of the official scripts of the Indian Republic.

The primary scripture of Sikhism, the Guru Granth Sahib, is written in Gurmukhī, in various dialects and languages often subsumed under the generic title Sant Bhasha or saint language, in addition to other languages like Persian and various phases of Indo-Aryan languages.

Modern Gurmukhī has thirty-five original letters, hence its common alternative term paintī or "the thirty-five," plus six additional consonants, nine vowel diacritics, two diacritics for nasal sounds, one diacritic that geminates consonants and three subscript characters.

History and development
The Gurmukhī script is generally believed to have roots in the Proto-Sinaitic alphabet by way of the Brahmi script, which developed further into the Northwestern group (Sharada, or Śāradā, and its descendants, including Landa and Takri), the Central group (Nagari and its descendants, including Devanagari, Gujarati and Modi) and the Eastern group (evolved from Siddhaṃ, including Bangla, Tibetan, and some Nepali scripts), as well as several prominent writing systems of Southeast Asia and Sinhala in Sri Lanka, in addition to scripts used historically in Central Asia for extinct languages like Saka and Tocharian. Gurmukhi is derived from Sharada in the Northwestern group, of which it is the only major surviving member, with full modern currency.
Notable features:
 It is an abugida in which all consonants have an inherent vowel, . Diacritics, which can appear above, below, before or after the consonant they are applied to, are used to change the inherent vowel.
 When they appear at the beginning of a syllable, vowels are written as independent letters.
 To form consonant clusters, Gurmukhi uniquely affixes subscript letters at the bottom of standard characters, rather than using the true conjunct symbols used by other scripts, which merge parts of each letter into a distinct character of its own.
 Punjabi is a tonal language with three tones. These are indicated in writing using the formerly voiced aspirated consonants (gh, dh, bh, etc.) and the intervocalic h. 

Gurmukhi evolved in cultural and historical circumstances notably different from other regional scripts, for the purpose of recording scriptures of Sikhism, a far less Sanskritized cultural tradition than others of the subcontinent. This independence from the Sanskritic model allowed it the freedom to evolve unique orthographical features. These include: 
Three basic carrier vowels, integrated into the traditional Gurmukhi character set, using the vowel markers to write independent vowels, instead of distinctly separate characters for each of these vowels as in other scripts; 
a drastic reduction in the number and importance of conjunct characters (similar to Brahmi, the letters of which Gurmukhi letters have remained more similar to than other scripts have, and characteristic of Northwestern abugidas);
a unique standard ordering of characters that somewhat diverges from the traditional vargiya, or Sanskritic, ordering of characters, including vowels and fricatives being placed in front; 
a gemination diacritic, a unique feature among native subcontinental scripts, which help to illustrate the preserved Middle Indo-Aryan geminates distinctive of Punjabi; 
and other features.

From the 10th century onwards, regional differences started to appear between the Sharada script used in Punjab, the Hill States (partly Himachal Pradesh) and Kashmir. Sharada proper was eventually restricted to very limited ceremonial use in Kashmir, as it grew increasingly unsuitable for writing the Kashmiri language. With the last known inscription dating to 1204 C.E., the early 13th century marks a milestone in the development of Sharada. The regional variety in Punjab continued to evolve from this stage through the 14th century; during this period it starts to appear in forms closely resembling Gurmukhī and other Landa scripts. By the 15th century, Sharada had evolved so considerably that epigraphists denote the script at this point by a special name, Devāśeṣa. Tarlochan Singh Bedi (1999) prefers the name Pritham Gurmukhī, or Proto-Gurmukhī.

The Sikh gurus adopted Proto-Gurmukhī to write the Guru Granth Sahib, the religious scriptures of the Sikhs. The Takri alphabet developed through the Devāśeṣa stage of the Sharada script from the 14th-18th centuries and is found mainly in the Hill States such as Chamba, Himachal Pradesh and surrounding areas, where it is called Chambeali. In Jammu Division, it developed into Dogri, which was a "highly imperfect" script later consciously influenced in part by Gurmukhi during the late 19th century, possibly to provide it an air of authority by having it resemble scripts already established in official and literary capacities, though not displacing Takri. The local Takri variants got the status of official scripts in some of the Punjab Hill States, and were used for both administrative and literary purposes until the 19th century. After 1948, when Himachal Pradesh was established as an administrative unit, the local Takri variants were replaced by Devanagari.

Meanwhile, the mercantile scripts of Punjab known as the Laṇḍā scripts were normally not used for literary purposes. Laṇḍā means alphabet "without tail", implying that the script did not have vowel symbols. In Punjab, there were at least ten different scripts classified as Laṇḍā, Mahajani being the most popular. The Laṇḍā scripts were used for household and trade purposes. In contrast to Laṇḍā, the use of vowel diacritics was made obligatory in Gurmukhī for increased accuracy and precision, due to the difficulties involved in deciphering words without vowel signs.

In the following epochs, Gurmukhī became the primary script for the literary writings of the Sikhs. Playing a significant role in Sikh faith and tradition, it expanded from its original use for Sikh scriptures and developed its own orthographical rules, spreading widely under the Sikh Empire and used by Sikh kings and chiefs of Punjab for administrative purposes. Also playing a major role in consolidating and standardizing the Punjabi language, it served as the main medium of literacy in Punjab and adjoining areas for centuries when the earliest schools were attached to gurdwaras. The first natively produced grammars of the Punjabi language were written in the 1860s in Gurmukhi. The Singh Sabha Movement of the late 19th century, a movement to revitalize Sikh institutions which had declined during colonial rule after the fall of the Sikh Empire, also advocated for the usage of the Gurmukhi script for mass media, with print media publications and Punjabi-language newspapers established in the 1880s. Later in the 20th century, after the struggle of the Punjabi Suba movement, from the founding of modern India in the 1940s to the 1960s, the script was given the authority as the official state script of the Punjab, India, where it is used in all spheres of culture, arts, education, and administration, with a firmly established common and secular character.

Etymology
The prevalent view among Punjabi linguists is that as in the early stages the Gurmukhī letters were primarily used by the Guru's followers, Gurmukhs (literally, those who face, or follow, the Guru, as opposed to a Manmukh); the script thus came to be known as Gurmukhī, "the script of those guided by the Guru." Guru Angad is credited in the Sikh tradition with the creation and standardization of Gurmukhi script from earlier Śāradā-descended scripts native to the region. It is now the standard writing script for the Punjabi language in India. The original Sikh scriptures and most of the historic Sikh literature have been written in the Gurmukhi script.

Although the word Gurmukhī has been commonly translated as "from the Mouth of the Guru," the term used for the Punjabi script has somewhat different connotations. This usage of the term may have gained currency from the use of the script to record the utterances of the Sikh Gurus as scripture, which were often referred to as Gurmukhī, or from the mukh (face, or mouth) of the Gurus. Consequently, the script that was used to write the resulting scripture may have also been designated with the same name.

The name for the Perso–Arabic alphabet for the Punjabi language, Shahmukhi, was modeled on the term Gurmukhi.

Characters

Letters

The Gurmukhī alphabet contains thirty-five base letters (akkhara, plural akkharā̃), traditionally arranged in seven rows of five letters each. The first three letters, or mātarā vāhak ("vowel carrier"), are distinct because they form the basis for vowels and are not consonants, or vianjan, like the remaining letters are, and except for the second letter aiṛā are never used on their own; see  for further details. The pair of fricatives, or mūl varag ("base class"), share the row, which is followed by the next five sets of consonants, with the consonants in each row being homorganic, the rows arranged from the back (velars) to the front (labials) of the mouth, and the letters in the grid arranged by place and manner of articulation. The arrangement, or varaṇamālā, is completed with the antim ṭolī, literally "ending group." The names of most of the consonants are based on their reduplicative phonetic values, and the varaṇamālā is as follows:

The nasal letters ਙ /ŋəŋːaː/ and ਞ /ɲəɲːaː/ have become marginal as independent consonants in modern Gurmukhi. The sounds they represent occur most often as allophones of [] in clusters with velars and palatals respectively.

The pronunciation of ਵ can vary allophonically between // preceding front vowels, and // elsewhere.

The most characteristic feature of the Punjabi language is its tone system. The script has no separate symbol for tones, but they correspond to the tonal consonants that once represented voiced aspirates as well as older *h. To differentiate between consonants, the Punjabi tonal consonants of the fourth column, ਘ kà, ਝ cà, ਢ ṭà, ਧ tà, and ਭ pà, are often transliterated in the way of the voiced aspirate consonants gha, jha, ḍha, dha, and bha respectively, although Punjabi lacks these sounds. Tones in Punjabi can be either rising, neutral, or falling; in the pronunciation of the names of the Gurmukhī letters, they are at the beginning of the word and as such produce the falling tone, hence the grave accent (à) as opposed to the acute. The tone on the stem vowel changes to a rising one (á) and precedes the letter when it is in syllabic coda positions, and is falling when the letter in stem-medial positions after a short vowel and before a long vowel, and when the tonal letter follows the stem vowel. The letters now always represent unaspirated consonants, and are unvoiced in initial positions and voiced elsewhere.

Supplementary letters

In addition to the 35 original letters, there are six supplementary consonants in official usage, referred to as the navīn ṭolī or navīn varag, meaning "new group," created by placing a dot (bindī) at the foot (pair) of the consonant to create pair bindī consonants. These are not present in the Guru Granth Sahib or old texts. These are used most often for loanwords, though not exclusively, and their usage is not always obligatory:

The character ਲ਼ /ɭ/, the only character not representing a fricative consonant, was only recently officially added to the Gurmukhī alphabet. It was not a part of the traditional orthography, as the distinctive phonological difference between /l/ and /ɭ/, while both native sounds, was not reflected in the script; however, its usage, while still currently not universal, has been noted along with the other letters of the group among the earliest Punjabi grammars produced. Previous usage of another glyph to represent this sound, [ਲ੍ਰ], has also been attested. The Shahmukhi alphabet equivalent for representing the sound is ࣇ, "lam with tah above."
Other characters, like the more recent [ਕ਼] //, are also on rare occasion used unofficially, chiefly for transliterating old writings in Persian and Urdu, the knowledge of which is less relevant in modern times.

Subscript letters

Three "subscript" letters, called dutt akkhara ("joint letters") or pairī̃ akkhara ("letters at the foot") are utilised in modern Gurmukhī: forms of ਹ (ha), ਰ (ra), and ਵ (va).

The subscript ਰ (r) and ਵ (v) are used to make consonant clusters and behave similarly; subjoined ਹ (h) introduces tone.

In addition to the three standard subscript letters, another subscript character representing the subjoined /j/, the yakash or pairī̃ yayyā ( ੵ U+0A75), is utilized specifically in archaized sahaskritī-style writings in Sikh scripture, where it is found 268 times for word forms and inflections from older phases of Indo-Aryan, as in the examples ਰਖੵਾ /ɾəkʰːjaː/ "(to be) protected," ਮਿਥੵੰਤ /mɪt̪ʰjən̪t̪ə/ "deceiving," ਸੰਸਾਰਸੵ /sənsaːɾəsjə/ "of the world," ਭਿਖੵਾ /pɪ̀kʰːjaː/ "(act of) begging," etc. There is also a conjunct form of the letter yayyā, ਯ→੍ਯ, which functions similarly to the yakash, and is used exclusively for Sanskrit borrowings, and even then rarely. In addition, miniaturized versions of the letters ਚ, ਟ, ਤ, and ਨ are also found in limited use as subscript letters in Sikh scripture.

Only the subjoined /ɾ/ and /h/ are commonly used; usage of the subjoined /ʋ/ and conjoined forms of /j/, already rare, is increasingly scarce in modern contexts.

Vowel diacritics

To express vowels (singular, sur), Gurmukhī, as an abugida, makes use of obligatory diacritics called lagā̃. Gurmukhī is similar to Brahmi scripts in that all consonants are followed by an inherent schwa sound. This inherent vowel sound can be changed by using dependent vowel signs which attach to a bearing consonant. In some cases, dependent vowel signs cannot be used – at the beginning of a word or syllable for instance – and so an independent vowel character is used instead.

Independent vowels are constructed using three bearer characters: ūṛā (ੳ), aiṛā (ਅ) and īṛī (ੲ).  With the exception of aiṛā (which represents the vowel ), the bearer consonants are never used without additional vowel signs.

Dotted circles represent the bearer consonant. Vowels are always pronounced after the consonant they are attached to. Thus, sihārī is always written to the left, but pronounced after the character on the right.

Orthography
Gurmukhi orthography prefers vowel sequences over the use of semivowels ("y" or "w") intervocally and in syllable nuclei, as in the words ਦਿਸਾਇਆ disāiā "caused to be visible" rather than disāyā, ਦਿਆਰ diāra "cedar" rather than dyāra, and ਸੁਆਦ suāda "taste" rather than swāda, permitting vowels in hiatus.

In terms of tone orthography, the short vowels [ɪ] and [ʊ], when paired with [h] to yield /ɪh/ and /ʊh/, represent [é] and [ó] with high tones respectively, e.g. ਕਿਹੜਾ kihṛā 'which,' ਦੁਹਰਾ duhrā "repeat, reiterate, double." The compounding of [əɦ] with [ɪ] or [ʊ] yield [ɛ́] and [ɔ́] respectively, e.g. ਮਹਿੰਗਾ mahingā "expensive," ਵਹੁਟੀ vahuṭī "bride."

Other signs
The diacritics for gemination and nasalization are together referred to as lagākkhara ("applied letters").

Gemination
The use of adhak ( ੱ ) indicates that the following consonant is geminated, and is placed above the consonant preceding the geminated one. Consonant length is distinctive in the Punjabi language and the use of this diacritic can change the meaning of a word, for example:

There is a tendency, especially in rural dialects, to geminate consonants following a long vowel (/a:/, /e:/, /i:/, /o:/, /u:/, /ɛ:/, /ɔː/) in the penult of a word, e.g. ਔਖਾ aukkhā "difficult," ਕੀਤੀ kīttī "did," ਪੋਤਾ pottā "grandson," ਪੰਜਾਬੀ panjābbī "Punjabi," ਹਾਕ hāka "call, shout," but plural ਹਾਕਾਂ hākkā̃.
Except in this case, where this unmarked gemination is often etymologically rooted in archaic forms, and has become phonotactically regular, the usage of the adhak is obligatory.

Nasalisation
Ṭippī ( ੰ ) and bindī ( ਂ )  are used for producing a nasal phoneme depending on the following obstruent or a nasal vowel at the end of a word. All short vowels are nasalized using ṭippī  and all long vowels are nasalized using bindī except for dulaiṅkaṛ ( ੂ ), which uses ṭippi instead. 

Older texts may follow other conventions.

Vowel suppression

The halanta  ( ੍ U+0A4D) character is not used when writing Punjabi in Gurmukhī. However, it may occasionally be used in Sanskritised text or in dictionaries for extra phonetic information. When it is used, it represents the suppression of the inherent vowel.

The effect of this is shown below:

ਕ – kə

ਕ੍ – k

Punctuation

The ḍaṇḍī (।) is used in Gurmukhi to mark the end of a sentence. A doubled ḍaṇḍī, or doḍaṇḍī (॥) marks the end of a verse.

The visarga symbol (ਃ U+0A03) is used very occasionally in Gurmukhī. It can represent an abbreviation, as the period is used in English, though the period for abbreviation, like commas, exclamation points, and other Western punctuation, is freely used in modern Gurmukhī.

Numerals

Gurmukhī has its own set of digits, which function exactly as in other versions of the Hindu–Arabic numeral system. These are used extensively in older texts. In modern contexts, they are sometimes replaced by standard Western Arabic numerals.

*In some Punjabi dialects, the word for three is ਤ੍ਰੈ trai.

Spacing 

Before the 1970's, Gurbani and other Sikh scriptures were written in the traditional scriptio continua method of writing the Gurmukhi script known as larivār where there were no spacing between words in the texts (interpuncts in the form of a dot were used by some to differentiate between words, such as by Guru Arjan). This is opposed to the comparatively more recent method of writing in Gurmukhi known as pad ched, which breaks the words by inserting spacing between them.

First line of the Guru Granth Sahib, the Mul Mantar, in larivār (continuous form) and pad ched (spacing form):

Laṛivār: ੴਸਤਿਨਾਮੁਕਰਤਾਪੁਰਖੁਨਿਰਭਉਨਿਰਵੈਰੁਅਕਾਲਮੂਰਤਿਅਜੂਨੀਸੈਭੰਗੁਰਪ੍ਰਸਾਦਿ॥

Pad ched: ੴ ਸਤਿ ਨਾਮੁ ਕਰਤਾ ਪੁਰਖੁ ਨਿਰਭਉ ਨਿਰਵੈਰੁ ਅਕਾਲ ਮੂਰਤਿ ਅਜੂਨੀ ਸੈਭੰ ਗੁਰ ਪ੍ਰਸਾਦਿ ॥

Transliteration: Ik-ōaṅkār sati nāmu karatā purakhu nirbhau nirvairu akāl mūrati ajūnī saibhañ gur prasādi.

Unicode

Gurmukhī script was added to the Unicode Standard in October 1991 with the release of version 1.0.

Many sites still use proprietary fonts that convert Latin ASCII codes to Gurmukhī glyphs.

The Unicode block for Gurmukhī is U+0A00–U+0A7F:

Digitization of Gurmukhī manuscripts

Panjab Digital Library has taken up digitization of all available manuscripts of Gurmukhī Script. The script has been in formal use since the 1500s, and a lot of literature written within this time period is still traceable. Panjab Digital Library has digitized over 45 million pages from different manuscripts and most of them are available online.

Internet Domain names in Gurmukhi
Punjabi University Patiala has developed label generation rules for validating international domain names for internet in Gurmukhi.

See also
 Punjabi Braille
 Shahmukhi alphabet

Notes

References

Bibliography

.

The following Punjabi-language publications have been written on the origins of the Gurmukhī script:
 Alternative link
Ishar Singh Tãgh, Dr. Gurmukhi Lipi da Vigyamulak Adhiyan. Patiala: Jodh Singh Karamjit Singh.
Kala Singh Bedi, Dr. Lipi da Vikas. Patiala: Punjabi University, 1995.

 Alternative link
Prem Parkash Singh, Dr. "Gurmukhi di Utpati." Khoj Patrika, Patiala: Punjabi University.
Pritam Singh, Prof. "Gurmukhi Lipi." Khoj Patrika. p. 110, vol.36, 1992. Patiala: Punjabi University.
Sohan Singh Galautra. Punjab dian Lipiã.
Tarlochan Singh Bedi, Dr. Gurmukhi Lipi da Janam te Vikas. Patiala: Punjabi University, 1999.

External links

 Unicode script chart for Gurmukhi (PDF file)
 Gurmukhi Typewriter Online

Gurmukhī script
Officially used writing systems of India